The Bernie R-XIII School District is a public school district in Stoddard County, Missouri, United States, based in Bernie, Missouri.

Schools
The Bernie R-XIII School District has one elementary school and one high school.

Elementary school
Bernie Elementary School

High school
Bernie Junior High/High School

References

External links
 Bernie R-XIII School District
 Missouri Department of Elementary and Secondary Education

Education in Stoddard County, Missouri
School districts in Missouri